Liolaemus halonastes is a species of lizard in the family  Liolaemidae. It is native to Argentina.

References

halonastes
Reptiles described in 2010
Reptiles of Argentina